USS Limestone (IX-158), a  designated an unclassified miscellaneous vessel, was the only ship of the United States Navy to be named for limestone, a rock consisting chiefly of calcium carbonate, which yields lime when burned.

The ship was laid down 5 January 1944 by Barrett & Hilp, Belair Shipyard, in San Francisco, under a Maritime Commission contract (MC Hull 1338), and named  on 7 February 1944. Launched on 25 March 1944, sponsored by Mrs. Leo Heagerty, she was renamed and redesignated Limestone (IX-158) on 23 May 1944, acquired by the Navy on 14 October 1944, and placed in service the same day.

Service history
Limestone was towed to Subic Bay, Philippine Islands, for use as a United States Army and United States Marine Corps stores barge.  Limestone served near the advance bases in the Pacific until she returned to the United States in 1946. She was placed out of service 12 December 1946 at Seattle, Washington, and was sold to Foss Launch and Tug Company on 11 September 1947.

References

External links
 Photo gallery at Navsource.org

 

Trefoil-class concrete barges
Ships built in the San Francisco Bay Area
1944 ships